Homer Eugene Mechling (March 24, 1909 – January 26, 1975) was an American professional basketball player. He played in the National Basketball League for the Cincinnati Comellos during the 1937–38 season and averaged 6.0 points per game.

References

1909 births
1975 deaths
American men's basketball players
Basketball players from Ohio
Capital Comets men's basketball players
Cincinnati Comellos players
Guards (basketball)
High school basketball coaches in the United States
People from Muskingum County, Ohio